Aldis Imants Bērziņš (born October 3, 1956) is a Latvian-American former volleyball player, who was a member of the American Men's National Team that won the gold medal at the 1984 Summer Olympics playing opposite of Karch Kiraly.

College career
Bērziņš was a star outside hitter on the Ohio State volleyball team from 1975 through 1978.  In those years he led the Buckeyes to four straight Midwestern Intercollegiate Volleyball Association (MIVA) championships and four appearances in the NCAA Final Four.

Honors
 MIVA Player of the Year: 1977 and 1978
 All-MIVA First Team selection: 1976, 1977, 1978
 NCAA all-tournament team selection: 1977 and 1978
 Volleyball Magazine All-American: 1977 and 1978
 MVP of the U.S. Men's National Team: 1983
 All-Tournament Selection at the World Cup in Japan: 1985
 USA Volleyball 75th Annual All-Era Team
 Professional Volleyball player in Italy
 Ohio State Varsity O Hall of Fame: 2002

Recent activities
Bērziņš now works with the Special Olympics. He recently coached Maryland Volleyball Program at the 16's 17's and 18's levels. He has three sons, Kris, Mik, and Dainis. Kris recently played professionally in Greece after an illustrious career at Loyola University Chicago. Mik graduated from Ohio State University where he won an NCAA National Championship in 2011. Mik is currently the graduate assistant coach at another OSU, Oregon State University. Dainis started in 2011 for Loyola as an outside hitter.

Bērziņš was named head coach of the men's volleyball program at Stevenson University on October 6, 2016.

See also
 USA Volleyball

References

 
 

1956 births
Living people
American people of Latvian descent
Volleyball players at the 1984 Summer Olympics
Ohio State Buckeyes men's volleyball players
Olympic gold medalists for the United States in volleyball
Place of birth missing (living people)
American men's volleyball players
Medalists at the 1984 Summer Olympics